First-seeded Margaret Smith defeated Maria Bueno 5–7, 6–1, 6–2 in the final to win the women's singles tennis title at the 1964 French Championships.

Seeds
The seeded players are listed below. Margaret Smith is the champion; others show the round in which they were eliminated.

  Margaret Smith (champion)
  Maria Bueno (finalist)
  Lesley Turner (semifinals)
  Nancy Richey (fourth round)
  Jan Lehane (quarterfinals)
  Christine Truman (quarterfinals)
  Françoise Dürr (second round)
  Věra Suková (quarterfinals)
  Deidre Catt (fourth round)
  Annette Van Zyl (fourth round)
  Robyn Ebbern (fourth round)
  Liz Starkie (third round)
  Helga Schultze (semifinals)
  Madonna Schacht (fourth round)
  Judy Tegart (fourth round)
  Lea Pericoli (fourth round)

Draw

Key
 Q = Qualifier
 WC = Wild card
 LL = Lucky loser
 r = Retired

Finals

Earlier rounds

Section 1

Section 2

Section 3

Section 4

Section 5

Section 6

Section 7

Section 8

References

External links
   on the French Open website

1964 in women's tennis
1964
1964 in French women's sport
1964 in French tennis